The 198th Pennsylvania Volunteer Infantry was an infantry regiment that served in the Union Army during the American Civil War.

Service
The 198th Pennsylvania Infantry was organized at Philadelphia, Pennsylvania on September 9, 1864 and mustered in under the command of Colonel Horatio G. Sickel.

The regiment was attached to 1st Brigade, 1st Division, 5th Corps, Army of the Potomac.

The 198th Pennsylvania Infantry mustered out of service on June 4, 1865.

Detailed service
Left Pennsylvania for Petersburg, Va., September 19, 1864. Siege of Petersburg September 1864 to April 1865. Poplar Springs Church September 29-October 2, 1864. Reconnaissance to Boydton Road October 8. Boydton Plank Road, Hatcher's Run, October 27-28. Warren's Raid to Weldon Railroad December 7-12. Dabney's Mills, Hatcher's Run, February 5-7, 1865. Appomattox Campaign March 28-April 9. Junction, Quaker and Boydton Roads March 29. Lewis's Farm near Gravelly Run March 29. White Oak Road March 30-31. Five Forks April 1. Appomattox Court House April 9. Surrender of Lee and his army. Marched to Washington, D.C., May 1-12. Grand Review of the Armies May 23.

Casualties
The regiment lost a total of 117 men during service; 6 officers and 67 enlisted men killed or mortally wounded, 44 enlisted men died of disease.

Commanders
 Colonel Horatio G. Sickel

See also

 List of Pennsylvania Civil War Units
 Pennsylvania in the Civil War

References
 Dyer, Frederick H.  A Compendium of the War of the Rebellion (Des Moines, IA:  Dyer Pub. Co.), 1908.
 Wood, Jeffrey L. Under Chamberlain's Flag: The Stories of the 198th Pennsylvania Volunteers and the 185th New York Volunteers (Victoria, BC: Trafford), 2008. 
 Woodward, Evan Morrison. History of the One Hundred and Ninety-Eighth Pennsylvania Volunteers (Trenton, NJ: MacCrellish & Quigley), 1884.
Attribution
 

Military units and formations established in 1864
Military units and formations disestablished in 1865
Units and formations of the Union Army from Pennsylvania